Vicky Chen or Chen Hsiao-hsuan (born 17 July 1970) is a Taiwanese actress. She won the Golden Bell Award for Best Actress in a Miniseries or Television Film in 2009.

She and Jacky Wu had an affair, which ended in 2000. Chen married Chan Jen-hsiung in 2005. The couple had one child together before separating in 2007. Chen has worked with the fashion designer Kenji Du, and served as spokesperson for the Taiwan International Children's Film Festival.

Selected filmography
The Heaven Sword and Dragon Saber (1994)
Guan Gong (1996)
Book and Sword, Gratitude and Revenge (2002)
The Legend of Brown Sugar Chivalries (2008)
Down with Love (2010)
Go, Single Lady (2014)

References

External links

1970 births
Living people
Taiwanese television actresses
21st-century Taiwanese actresses
20th-century Taiwanese actresses